Sunanda Nair is an Indian dancer trained in Mohiniattam. She did her master's degree in this dance form from Nalanda Nritya Kala Mahavidyalaya affiliated to the University of Mumbai. She has completed her PhD from University of Mumbai for her thesis "Intrinsic Lyrical Feminism in Mohiniattam" . She was born in Mumbai, India.

Early life and education 
Nair took her initial training in Bharatanatyam at age six. She studied in Kathakali under Kalamandalam Krishnankutty Warrier.

Nair is a disciple of noted Mohiniattam exponent Padmabhushan Dr.(Smt) Kanak Rele, credited for the revival and popularization of this classical Kerala dance style.

Nair was the first student to earn a master's degree in Mohiniattam. She was a student of Nalanda Nritya Kala Mahavidyalay at the University of Mumbai where she completed her Master's. She completed a seven-year course in five years. The institution is the closest to the guru Kula Sampradaya.

She has a bachelor's degree in commerce from University of Mumbai,  Bachelors & Masters in Performing Arts, from University of Mumbai.   She also holds a PhD in dance from University of Mumbai - Research thesis in Mohiniattam titled "The Intrinsic Lyrical Feminism in Mohiniattam"

Career

After graduating, she joined the staff at Nalanda and was a lecturer at her alma mater for nine years until 1999. She passed her Net exam, a UGC requirement to continue teaching at Nalanda.

She has given many performances.

She studied from masters like Kalaimamani Kadirvelu, Kalaimamani Mahalingam Pillai, Guru T.V.Sounderajan, Shri Dipak Majumdar,  and Smt.Tejiswini Rao in Kattumanar Muthukumar Pillai's bani.

In 1980, while in high school, she started the Srutilaya Institute of Fine Arts which trains students in both Mohiniattam and Bharatanatyam.

SPARC is now in its 10th year of operation in the US. At SPARC, the rich tradition of Indian Classical Dance is passed to new dancers.

Performances

 Festival of India in the former USSR
 Spring Friendship Art Festival in North Korea
 Performances in Middle East, Singapore and U.S.A.
 Khajuraho festival in Madhya Pradesh
 Konark festival in Orissa
 Yuva Mahotsav in Jaipur, Jodhpur and Udaipur
 Nishagandhi, Kerala Tourism, Trivandrum
 Kalidas Samaraoh, Ujjain
 Modera Festival, Gujarat
 Mysore Dassera Festival
 Nrityotsava, Central Sangeet Natak Akademi, Bangalore
 Indo-Indonesian Friendship Society
 Vallathol Jayanti, Kerala Kalamandalam
 SAARC Conference, Mumbai
 Sangeeta Sabha, Poona
 Swati Tirunal Sangeet Sabha, Trivandrum
 Chakradhar Samaraoh, Rajasthan Sangeet Natak Akademi
 India International Centre, Apna Utsav, New Delhi
 Krishna Gana Sabha, Bharat Kalachar, Bharatiya Music and Arts, Madras
 The National Centre For Performing Arts, Mumbai
 Haridas Sangeet Sammelan, Mumbai
 Kal-Ke-Kalakar, Mumbai
 Nitya Nityati And Tanmai Arohanam Festival, Bangalore
 India Habitat Centre, New Delhi
 Shree Chitra Dance Festival, Trivandrum
 Natyanjali Trust, Music Academy, Chennai
 National Festival of Mohini Attam, Nehru Center, Mumbai
 Soorya Parampara dance festival, Trivandrum, Kerala
 India Habitat Center, New Delhi
 Dharini, Cochin, Kerala
 Monsoon Festival Art India, New Delhi
 Raindrops Festival NCPA, Samved Mumbai
 Bharatam, Trichur, Kerala
 Sopanam, Bombay
 Kalakshetram, Bombay
 Asia Pacific Heritage Festival
 Kerala Sangeet Natak Academy -July 2015, Bhopal

Recognition

 'Global Mannam award', Nair Service Society of North America, New York 2020
 'Nrithya Seva Mani award', Cleveland Thyagaraja Festival 2020
 'Global Excellence Award for Performing Arts', 6th International Media Conference 2019
 'Citation' from Bangalore Club for Kathakali & the Arts 2018
 'Muthirai Pathitha Vithagar', Natyanjali Festival, Natyanjali Trust 2018
 'Anantha Margaseersha Natya Puraskaram', NSSONA, Nair Sangamam 2018
 'Nalanda Kanaka Nartana Puraskaar', Nalanda Dance Research Centre 2017
 ‘Kalarathnam’ from Kerala Kalamandalam 2016.         
 Kerala Sangeetha Nataka Akademi Award (Kalasree Award) 2011
 'Global Excellence Award' 2011, from GIA, New Delhi
 "Kalaasagar" 2010 in memory of Late Kalamandalam Krishnankutty Poduval
 "Abhinaya shiromani" from Surya Performing Arts, Missouri, USA.
  Scholarship from Central Sangeet Natak Akademi for advanced training in abhinaya and choreography
 'Singar Mani' from Sur Singar Samsad, Mumbai
  Nelluvai Nambeeshan Smarak Award for Mohiniattam
 'Natya Mayuri' Natyanjali Trust, Chennai
  Best Ethnic Classical Arts Award, New Orleans, 2003
  Louisiana State Artist Roster
  Louisiana Touring Directory
  Global Excellence Dance Award, New Orleans
  Presidents Award for Community Service, Indian Assoc of New Orleans

See also
 Indian women in dance

References

External links

 

Living people
Artists from Mumbai
Mohiniyattam exponents
Indian female classical dancers
Dancers from Maharashtra
Women artists from Maharashtra
Year of birth missing (living people)
20th-century Indian dancers
Performers of Indian classical dance
Indian classical choreographers
Indian art educators
Indian women choreographers
Indian choreographers
20th-century Indian women artists
Mohiniyattam
Bharatanatyam exponents
Recipients of the Kerala Sangeetha Nataka Akademi Award